Adelia, o La figlia dell'arciere (Adelia, or The Archer's Daughter) is an opera in three acts by Gaetano Donizetti. The opera premiered at the Teatro Apollo, Rome on 11 February 1841.

Roles

Synopsis
Time: "The past"
Place: Burgundy

The story features the protagonist, Adelia, the daughter of Arnoldo, one of Duke Carlo's bodyguards. The Duke returns from a successful battle to find a fellow nobleman, Count Oliviero, leaving Arnoldo's house which is on Carlo's estate. The chorus then sing rumors that Oliviero has slept with Adelia, taking her virginity. The Duke sentences Oliviero to death for this perceived transgression, but the other characters prevent this. By the end of the opera, all agree to the marriage.

Notable arias and numbers
Act 1
Arnoldo: "Siam giunti"
Adelia: "Fui presaga; ah, tu lo vedi"
Act 2
Duet: Adelia and Arnoldo: "Ah, no, non posso"
Duet: Adelia and Oliviero: "Tutto di te sollecito"
Act 3
Oliviero: "Che fia di me!"
Adelia: "Ah! mi lasciate"

Recordings

References

Further reading
 Allitt, John Stewart (1991), Donizetti: in the light of Romanticism and the teaching of Johann Simon Mayr, Shaftesbury: Element Books (UK); Rockport, Massachusetts: Element (USA)
 Ashbrook, William (1982), Donizetti and His Operas, Cambridge University Press. .
 Ashbrook, William (1998), "Donizetti, Gaetano" in Stanley Sadie (ed.), The New Grove Dictionary of Opera, vol. 1. London: Macmillan. . 
 Ashbrook, William and Sarah Hibberd (2001), in Holden, Amanda (ed.), The New Penguin Opera Guide, New York: Penguin Putnam. . pp. 224–247.
 Black, John (1982), Donizetti’s Operas in Naples, 1822–1848. London: The Donizetti Society.
 Loewenberg, Alfred (1970). Annals of Opera, 1597–1940, 2nd edition. Rowman and Littlefield
 Sadie, Stanley, (ed.); John Tyrell (exec. ed.) (2004), The New Grove Dictionary of Music and Musicians. 2nd edition. London: Macmillan.  (hardcover).   (eBook).
 Weinstock, Herbert (1963), Donizetti and the World of Opera in Italy, Paris, and Vienna in the First Half of the Nineteenth Century, New York: Pantheon Books.

External links
 
 Libretto, opera.stanford.edu

Operas
1841 operas
Italian-language operas
Operas by Gaetano Donizetti
Melodramas
Libretti by Felice Romani
Operas set in France
Operas set in the 15th century